Richie (formerly titled as Santa Maria and Avargal) is a 2017 Indian Tamil-language neo noir action crime film directed by Gautham Ramachandran and written by Rakshit Shetty. It is a remake of the 2014 Kannada film Ulidavaru Kandanthe and stars Nivin Pauly in the title role, along with Natraj, Shraddha Srinath, and Lakshmi Priyaa Chandramouli in lead roles, while Prakash Raj, Elango Kumaravel, Raj Bharath, and Aadukalam Murugadoss play supporting roles.

The film began production in June 2016. and was released in India on 8 December 2017.

Plot
The film opens on Boxing Day with Megha, a news reporter from Chennai who is writing a story about the mysterious death of a young man named Richard K. Sagayam alias Richie, who was shot dead during a Santa Claus parade in the port city of Thoothukudi. Megha actually knows Richie as he grew up at the reform school her parents used to work at. Megha goes to the port city to investigate the story for her article.

By questioning many villagers, Megha learns that Richie was wrongly sent to the reform school for killing a classmate, even though his childhood best friend Raghu was the culprit. However, Raghu managed to run away from the city and escape the law. The local police then framed Richie for the murder in order to close the case. After witnessing his son beating up another boy at the school, Richie's father, the local priest Father A. K. Sagayam stopped visiting him. After leaving school, Richie returned to his hometown and became the henchman of Isaac Annachi, the don of the city who controlled the local fisherman community. Anything taken from the sea is split between the fishermen and Annachi.

One evening, "Kaaka" Peter, a local fisherman, finds an ancient statue in the sea and tries to sell it by himself to a smuggler from Kolkata. However, Annachi finds out about this and has Richie abduct Peter to find out where the statue is. Peter's best friend, the motorboat mechanic Selvam alias Selvaa, who is in love with Peter's sister Philomena, tries to search for him. As it turns out, Raghu works for the smuggler. Wanting to make money for himself, Raghu steals the statue and returns to Thoothukudi for the first time in years. He secretly meets his widowed mother Radha and promises to take her with him to Dubai, where they can start a new life.

On Christmas Eve, Annachi learns that Peter sold the statue to a smuggler in Kolkata who has allegedly run away to Thoothukudi. He is then also told by Radha that her long-lost son has returned last night from Kolkata. Sensing the connection between the two cases, Annachi sends Richie to retrieve the statue from Raghu. Richie forcefully brings Raghu onto one of his boats, where he tortures Peter in front of him as punishment for going behind Annachi's back. Richie then reveals to Raghu that when he was tormented at the reform school and can never change now. However, after taking the statue, he lets Raghu go but keeps Peter captive. Raghu returns to his mother and tells her to wait for him at the train station the next day so that they can leave the city forever.

On Christmas morning, Raghu manages to track down the house of Murugesh, Richie's friend from the reform home and another member of Annachi's gang. Raghu steals the statue from the house and tries to run away but is captured by Richie and his men. Richie secretly tells Murugesh that he still cares for Raghu and he plans to let his former friend run away with the statue and his mother. However, while driving Raghu to the train station to meet his mother, Raghu starts to get suspicious of Richie's intentions and tries to kill him but ends up getting killed by his childhood friend. Murugesh and their other friends help Richie dispose of Raghu's body in the sea. Radha is shown waiting at the train station for Raghu, who will never come.

Later in the evening, Sagayam is participating in the parade and stops at Annachi's house to bless his own son for the very first time in years. Meanwhile, Selvaa finds Peter's bloodied mask in Richie's jeep, which leads him to believe that Richie killed Peter. He steals Murugesh's gun and shoots Richie while he is dancing in the parade. Murugesh follows Selvaa and guns him down, too. Meanwhile, another one of Annachi's goons finds the statue and runs away with it, while the parade turns into a commotion.

Peter manages to escape his captivity and Murugesh is arrested for killing Selvaa. Both of them and Annachi narrate their story to Megha.

Cast
 Nivin Pauly as Richard K. Sagayam (Richie), an area rowdy who works under Annachi in Manapad and is killed by Selvaa
 Natraj as Selvam (Selvaa), a motorboat mechanic from Madurai and Peter's best friend who is killed by Murugesh
 Shraddha Srinath as Megha, a newspaper writer who wrote the mystery in Richie's murder case
 Lakshmi Priyaa Chandramouli as Philomena, Peter's sister and Selva's love interest
 Prakash Raj as Father A. K. Sagayam, Richie's father and a Church Father
 Elango Kumaravel as "Kaaka" Peter, a fisherman who got an idol in the sea and is held captive by Richie
 Raj Bharath as Raghu, Richie's childhood friend who ran to Kolkata but is later killed
 Aadukalam Murugadoss as Murugesh, Richie's juvenile home friend and sidekick and member of Annachi's gang
 Tulasi as Radha, Raghu's widowed mother
 G. K. Reddy as Isaac Annachi, an underworld don in Manapad who controls the fishermen community
 Bhargav Ramakrishnan as Das
 Winner Ramachandran as Village Chief
 Sivaraju as Sudhi

Production

Development 
In 2012, Gautham Ramachandran met Nivin Pauly and the pair began discussing the idea of making a bilingual film. They developed several story lines but then chose to purchase the remake rights of Rakshit Shetty's Kannada film Ulidavaru Kandanthe (2014), after being impressed with the script. Gautham began working on the script during June 2015 and revealed that nearly 40 drafts were made as he changed the screenplay of the original to fit in with the Tamil milieu. Nivin Pauly had also worked closely with Gautham on scripting the Tamil version, with the pair dropping their initial plans of making it a bilingual venture in Malayalam too. In April 2015, Gautham denied that Varalaxmi Sarathkumar had been signed on as the lead actress. The film was later dubbed in Malayalam with certain scenes being retained with the Tamil dialogue.

Casting 
Natarajan Subramaniam joined the team to play another leading role, after the team had considered casting other actors including Sasikumar. Gautham revealed that Natarajan was eventually chosen because they wanted an actor who did not carry any particular image. Kannada actress Shraddha Srinath was signed on to play the leading female role opposite Nivin, while Lakshmi Priyaa Chandramouli and Elango Kumaravel were signed on to portray supporting roles as members of a fishermen community. Veteran producer G. K. Reddy, the father of actor Vishal, was signed on to play a supporting role in the film during the first schedule.

Filming 
The film began the first schedule of its shoot in Tuticorin during early June 2016. Previously the movie was titled as Santa Maria and then the name was changed to Avargal. Later,  it was titled as Richie.

Ashok Selvan shot for a cameo appearance in the film during September 2016, but the scenes were not featured in the final version.

Soundtrack

Music was composed by B. Ajaneesh Loknath who composed the original Kannada film retaining all the tunes. This is B. Ajaneesh Loknath's second Tamil soundtrack album after Kurangu Bommai. Audio for the movie was launched along with trailer on 23 November 2017.

References

External links
 

Tamil remakes of Kannada films
2010s Tamil-language films
2017 films
Indian crime action films
2010s mystery thriller films
2017 crime thriller films
Indian mystery thriller films
Indian neo-noir films
2017 crime action films